José de Almeida Batista Pereira (26 July 1917 – 30 January 2009) was a Brazilian bishop of the Roman Catholic Church.

Pereira was born in São Gonçalo, Brazil and was ordained a priest on 22 December 1940. He was appointed Auxiliary bishop of the Diocese of Niteroi, along with Titular Bishop of Baris in Pisidia, on 22 December 1953 and ordained titular bishop of Baris in Pisidia on 2 February 1954. In 1955, Pereira was appointed bishop of the Diocese of Sete Lagoas where he remained until 1964. On 7 April 1964, Pereira was appointed bishop of the Diocese of Guaxupé where he remained until his resignation from the diocese 16 January 1976.

External links
 Catholic Hierarchy
 Guaxupé Diocese
 Niteroi Diocese

1917 births
2009 deaths
Participants in the Second Vatican Council
20th-century Roman Catholic bishops in Brazil
Roman Catholic bishops of Guaxupé
Roman Catholic bishops of Sete Lagoas